Wowaka (stylized as wowaka, ; 4 November 19875 April 2019), also known as Genjitsutouhi-P, was a Japanese musician. Considered to be a pioneer in the Vocaloid industry, wowaka was internationally acclaimed for his musical work over a career spanning a decade.

Wowaka began his career in 2009, debuting with the song  He later co-founded the record label Balloom in 2011, and in the same year released his debut album , which is considered to be a classic work in the Vocaloid industry. Following this, joined the band Hitorie as the lead vocalist, and continued work there for the rest of his career.

On 5 April 2019, at the age of 31, he died due to heart failure.

Early life
Wowaka was born in Kagoshima Prefecture, Japan on 4 November 1987. He was interested in joining rock bands since his middle school, starting as a guitarist, he joined bands in his high school and college. He was an alumnus of University of Tokyo, and was the leader of the music club . In college, he began composing original music for his band.

Career 
Wowaka's first contact with Vocaloid music was in December 2008, when he listened to livetune's song Last Night, Good Night. Taking a liking to the song, he was shocked to learn that this song was the work of one man. He then quit his band, and began creating Vocaloid music using Hatsune Miku in April 2009. Wowaka began his musical career in May 2009, by uploading his original Vocaloid music titled  to the Japanese video-sharing website Niconico Douga. In the video of In the Gray Zone, trying to convey the image of the song without using illustrations of Vocaloid characters, wowaka used his own drawing instead, and, for consistency, he kept this style in all his later Vocaloid works.

Wowaka's songs published on Niconico are characterised by obscure lyrics depicting thoughts of young women in fast-paced melodies. He has said that although he initially wanted to make music that can only be made using Vocaloid, he later realized the advantages of Vocaloid music. He became known under the name "Genjitsutouhi-P" after writing the phrase "Escaping from reality, how nice!" in several descriptions of his music. His works gained particularly large popularity on Niconico Douga. After releasing his self-published album, he helped found Balloom, an independent record label, along with other musicians popular on Niconico Douga.

In May 2011, wowaka released his debut studio album  under the Balloom label. The album released to widespread acclaim, peaking at 6th on Oricon and with several tracks, including the title track, entering Niconico Douga's Hall of Legends and Hall of Myths. It is considered a classic in the Vocaloid music industry, and is often considered Wowaka's signature work. The tracks, including "Two-faced Lovers", "World's End Dancehall", "Rolling Girl", and "Unhappy Refrain", all attained a cult following. Following this, wowaka was the composer and lyricist of the single And I'm Home, which was used as one of the ending theme songs in the 2011 anime series Puella Magi Madoka Magica. In the same year, he joined the rock band Hitorie as the primary vocalist and guitarist, and shifted his focus towards the band. Hitorie released their debut album  in 2012.

In August 2017, wowaka released his final Vocaloid song entitled  following six years since his previous works in Vocaloid. The song was created for Hatsune Miku's 10-year anniversary compilation album Re:Start. In October of the same year, he released his own vocal cover version of the song under Hitorie. In an interview, wowaka credited Hatsune Miku for getting him into making music. He stated: "I never gave it a second of thought 10 years ago as I posted songs, but no matter how you look at it, Hatsune Miku is the one who got me to start music. Miku is sort of like a mother figure to me."

Death 
Wowaka died in his sleep on 5 April 2019, due to heart failure, at the age of 31. The death was announced on Hitorie's website on 8 April 2019. After his death, the band postponed their planned tour but continued in September so as to not diminish Wowaka's legacy. The band has released 2 albums since his death. Band member Shinoda took wowaka's place as the vocalist. A private funeral was held by his family members. On 1 June 2019, Hitorie held a remembrance concert. On Hatsune Miku's Magical Mirai 2019 and Miku Expo Europe 2020 concerts, tributes were held to honor him.

Legacy 

Various Vocaloid artists have made music with wowaka as an inspiration. His songs like "Rolling Girl" and "World's End Dancehall" are widely influential and, along with other songs of his, have inspired others to make covers and derivative works. Following his death, fans of Wowaka paid tribute to him on various social media to commemorate his musical and vocal capabilities.

Musician Kenshi Yonezu, also known by his stage name Hachi when creating Vocaloid music, was a close friend of wowaka. After his death, Yonezu praised wowaka for having a deep impact on the concept of "Vocaloid-esque" music among Vocaloid creators, and that since his own music was also influenced by wowaka, he held his greatest respect for him.

Aiden Strawhun wrote on Kotaku that "For those who've been part of the Vocaloid community since Hatsune Miku's early days, Wowaka's name carries more than just the weight of nostalgia. It carries a teenage-angsty resonance thanks to songs such as the turbulent, cacophonic 'Rolling Girl.' [...] Where there is Hatsune Miku, there is Wowaka. [...] With his passing, we've not only lost a huge, immensely influential part of the community but a monumental part of our history. His work, though, will live on. Wowaka did more than create music for a generation. He created magic."

Discography

Studio albums

Compilation albums

Vocaloid songs

See also
 Vocaloid
 Hatsune Miku
 Megurine Luka
 Kenshi Yonezu

References

External links 
 wowaka
 balloom.net | ARTIST WOWAKA
 

1987 births
2019 deaths
21st-century Japanese composers
21st-century Japanese singers
21st-century Japanese male singers
Japanese male musicians
Japanese male singer-songwriters
Japanese singer-songwriters
Musicians from Kagoshima Prefecture
Place of death missing
University of Tokyo alumni
Vocaloid musicians